The Renault 80 hp, or Type WS in British service, was a V-8 aero engine that first ran in 1914. The engine was  manufactured in Britain by Renault Limited of West Brompton, London between August 1914 and December 1918, seven other companies, including Rolls-Royce and Brazil Straker, also produced the engine. The Renault V-8 engines were noted as inefficient but reliable, the inefficiency being mainly due to the excessively rich fuel/air mixture used to assist cooling.

Applications
Airco DH.6
Alliance P.1
Avro 548
Farman MF.11 Shorthorn
Farman F.41 and F.1,41
Vickers F.B.7A

Engines on display
 A preserved Renault 80 hp is on display at the Canada Aviation Museum.
 A partially cut open Renault 80 hp engine is on display at the Science Museum in London (photo 1, photo 2)
 Another one on display at the Museo Nacional de Aeronautica in Morón -Buenos Aires-Argentina

Specifications (80 hp)

See also

References

Notes

Bibliography

 Gunston, Bill. World Encyclopaedia of Aero Engines. Cambridge, England. Patrick Stephens Limited, 1989. 
 Lumsden, Alec. British Piston Engines and their Aircraft. Marlborough, Wiltshire: Airlife Publishing, 2003. .

External links

Instruction sur le Montage et le Réglage des Moteurs Renault Type 80 Chevaux. Engine manual (scan without plates)
Instruction sur le Montage et le Réglage des Moteurs Renault Type 80 Chevaux. Engine manual
Renault Moteur d'Aviation 80 Chevaux. Lyon: Imprimeries Réunies, Engine manual

1910s aircraft piston engines
80